MTHR Global (More Than HR Global) is a not for profit organisation based in Mumbai. It is a rapidly growing knowledge movement in India & new-age PAN India knowledge community which offers resources to assist HR professionals in Networking and knowledge-sharing that helps raise their own levels.

History

MTHR Global commenced as an online forum in Feb 2002 and has evolved into a New Age vibrant community. It is the probably the only HR Community in India having no constraining rules and no fees of any kind. The events of MTHR Global – began as evening get together with 30 people and today attract more than 200 – 400 Professionals for its Day long and Weekend events (5 to 7 events a year). It currently accommodates more than 15000 members and growing, who range from HR professionals, students, academics to business professionals, consultants and industry leaders. It has recently launched MTHR CxO forum exclusively for Senior Professionals (CxOs, VPs, Directors, SGMs etc.).

Academic collaboration

To encourage & nourish budding HR professionals MTHR has tie ups with academia to create a platform for the students to hone their skills & stay updated about recent industry trends. Events like Panel Discussions, Technical Seminars & orientation from industry experts are organised in these institutes to facilitate student development.

Few of the several collaborations include
 Alkesh Dinesh Mody Institute
 N. L. Dalmia Institute of Management Studies and Research
 Vivekanand Education Society's Institute of Management Studies and Research

Membership
The membership is not restricted to HR professionals. It is open to all professionals and students who have a quest to learn. One can register on the website or connect with the members on several social media forums.

Activities 

To equip HR professionals with latest industry trends and develop their leadership skills, MTHR Global in association with several corporations & institutions, organise workshops, seminars, panel discussions addressed by industry experts. Also there are Continuous Learning Programmes, Strategic HR course & mentor ship programmes & Behavioural Assessments for the members.

References

2002 establishments in Maharashtra
Non-profit organisations based in India
Organisations based in Mumbai
Organizations established in 2002